Leaf Mountain may refer to:

 Leaf Mountain Township, Otter Tail County, Minnesota
 Leaf Mountain Township, Burke County, North Dakota, in Burke County, North Dakota

Township name disambiguation pages